List of association handball clubs in France sorted by division

LNH Division 1 (Liqui Moly StarLigue) – 2022–23 season teams – 16 clubs

LNH Division 2 (ProLigue) – 2022–23 season teams – 16 clubs

LFH Division 1 Féminine (Ligue Butagaz Énergie) – 2022–23 season teams – 14 clubs

LFH Division 2 Féminine (D2F) – 2022–23 season teams – 14 clubs

Club by region (2022/2023)

Domestic competitions 
Men
 LNH Division 1 (Liqui Moly StarLigue)
 LNH Division 2 (ProLigue)
 Coupe de France
 Coupe de la Ligue
 Trophée des Champions
Women
LFH Division 1 Féminine
LFH Division 2 Féminine
Coupe de France

France
Handball